Indonesian horror are the  films of the horror genre produced by the Indonesian film industry. Often inspired by local folklore, Indonesian horror films have been produced in the country since the 1960s. After a hiatus during the Suharto era in the 1990s when censorship affected production, Indonesian horror films continued being produced following Reformasi in 1998.

History 

Ghosts and magical folklore have long been part of Indonesian culture. These later influenced the development of horror films. Kuntilanak are particularly prominent in local horror films.

During the authoritarian New Order regime under President Suharto, many horror films included religious symbolism and heroes to adhere to strict guidelines from censors. The Ministry Information under Ali Murtopo required that Indonesian films at the time had to follow strict moral and ethical guidelines, meaning many horror films juxtaposed violence and sexuality with religious heroes and themes. Thomas Barker has argued that films produced after 1998 in Indonesia have been particularly shaped by what he described as the residual "trauma" of violence under the preceding New Order era under President Suharto.

Suzzanna was a major film star in the 1970s and 1980s for her work in horror films. She appeared in 42 films before her death in 2008, including ,  and Sundel Bolong.

Indonesian horror films, particularly the work of Joko Anwar, attracted heightened international attention in the late 2010s, aided by streaming services. Some outlets declared films like Impetigore (2019) as part of a new wave of folk horror films from Southeast Asia. Impetigore was Indonesia's submission for the Academy Award for Best International Feature Film in its year of release and attracted international recognition, but was not nominated.

HBO Asia also released Indonesian-developed horror television series Halfworlds.

Notable films 

Badai-Selatan (1962)
  (1971)
Mystics in Bali (1981)
Sundelbolong (1981)
Satan's Slave (1981)
Lady Terminator (1988)
 Jelangkung (2001)
Kuntilanak (2006)
Macabre (2009)
The Forbidden Door (2009)
Firegate (2016)
Danur (2017)
Satan's Slaves (2017)
The 3rd Eye (2017)
Kuntilanak (2018)
Suzzanna: Buried Alive (2018)
Danur 2: Maddah (2018)
May the Devil Take You (2018)
Sabrina (2018)
Impetigore (2019)
The Queen of Black Magic (2019)
The 3rd Eye 2 (2020)
May the Devil Take You Too (2020)
Affliction (2021)
KKN di Desa Penari (2022)
Ivanna (2022)
Satan's Slaves 2: Communion (2022)

Notable directors 

Sisworo Gautama Putra
Tjut Djalil
The Mo Brothers (Kimo Stamboel and Timo Tjahjanto)

Joko Anwar

Highest-grossing horror film

See also 

Cinema of Indonesia
Folk horror

References